RC Girnik is a Ukrainian rugby club in Kryvyi Rih. They currently play in the Ukrainian rugby second league.

References

Ukrainian rugby union teams
SC Hirnyk Kryvyi Rih